Liotina tantilla is a species of small sea snail, a marine gastropod mollusk, in the family Liotiidae.

Description
The small, thick, white shell has a discoid shape and is deeply umbilicate. It contains 3½ convex whorls with concentric, grooved furrows. The last whorls has a rounded shape at the periphery. The umbilicus is of a moderate size. The aperture is circular.

Distribution
This marine species occurs off Japan.

References

 Higo, S., Callomon, P. & Goto, Y. (1999). Catalogue and bibliography of the marine shell-bearing Mollusca of Japan. Osaka. : Elle Scientific Publications. 749 pp.

External links
 To World Register of Marine Species

tantilla
Gastropods described in 1863